Hilda is an animated streaming television series based on the graphic novel series of the same name by Luke Pearson. Produced by Silvergate Media and Mercury Filmworks, the series follows the adventures of fearless Hilda, an 11-year-old blue-haired girl who, along with her mother Johanna and her deerfox Twig, moves to the city of Trolberg after their old residency in the outskirts of a forest is destroyed by a giant. Though moving away from the wild and into a bustling city, Hilda still manages to befriend even the most dangerous of monsters.

The series debuted on September 21, 2018 as a Netflix miniseries to critical acclaim. Due to the positive response, the series was renewed for a second season on October 8, 2018. The world premiere of the first two episodes was at the New York International Children's Film Festival on February 25, 2018. The second season was released on December 14, 2020, and a film titled Hilda and the Mountain King premiered on Netflix on December 30, 2021.

The show won Annie Awards for "Best Children's Series" twice in two years and Emmy Awards for "Outstanding Main Title Sequence", "Outstanding Children's TV Series" and "Outstanding Editing in a Daytime Program", tying the latter award with Animaniacs.

On November 19, 2021, Silvergate Media announced that the show has been renewed for a third season.

Premise
Hilda is a young girl who grew up with her mother Johanna in a small cabin on the edge of the woods near the walled-in city of Trolberg, between the late 1980s and the early 1990-1995s. Hilda and Johanna soon move permanently to the city for a better life and to give Hilda a proper upbringing. Over the course of the series, she and her deerfox Twig, later accompanied by an elf named Alfur, and best friends Frida and David, go on a number of adventures interacting with and befriending the mysterious animals, people, and spirits that live in and around the city of Trolberg.

Characters

Main
 Hilda (voiced by Bella Ramsey) – An adventurous 11-year-old Sparrow Scout who loves to explore the unknown lands with her pet deerfox Twig. Born in the woods, she soon moves to the city of Trolberg with great reluctance. However, Hilda is quick to adapt to her new home and environment, eventually becoming street smart, enrolling in school, learning to bike ride, and making friends. She later temporarily turns into a troll and learns what life is like in their nighttime world, all while trying to find a way home.
 Frida (voiced by Ameerah Falzon-Ojo) – Hilda's best friend, who is Black-British, fellow Sparrow Scout, a witch in-training, and one of the top students in their school. She has earned many badges as a Sparrow Scout due to her organization skills. She later begins magic training under Matilda Pilqvist to become a witch with Hilda as her familiar, eventually becoming well skilled at performing various powerful spells.
 David (voiced by Oliver Nelson) – Hilda and Frida's other best friend and fellow Sparrow Scout. He is insecure, easily frightened, loves collecting rocks, and has a knack for attracting insects. Despite his fearful nature, David is loyal, kind, and always there for his friends. David is normally reluctant to accompany Hilda and Frida on potentially dangerous adventures.
 Ilan Galkoff – David's singing voice
 Johanna "Mum" (voiced by Daisy Haggard) – Hilda's mother who works as a graphic designer as well as a general store employee. While tolerant of her daughter's adventures, Johanna still frequently fears for Hilda's safety, often becoming upset when Hilda lies about her whereabouts. After her home is smashed by a giant's foot, Johanna moved her and Hilda from their solitary life in the wilderness to an apartment in the bustling city of Trolberg. 
 Alfur Aldric (voiced by Rasmus Hardiker). – A paperwork-enthusiast elf who journeys with Hilda to Trolberg to learn about life in the city.
 Erik Ahlberg (voiced by John Hopkins) – The glory-seeking head of Trolberg's safety patrol. Later, he resigns from the role following the events of Hilda and the Mountain King. (added in Season 2)
 Gerda Gustav (voiced by Lucy Montgomery) – Ahlberg's deputy. In contrast to her boss, Deputy Gustav is extremely competent and wants to keep the people of Trolberg safe. She is later promoted to Chief Deputy following Ahlberg's resignation. (added in Season 2)

Recurring
All actors listed here are credited only as "Additional Voices" in the end credits. Information on specific characters comes from other sources, and they may play more characters than are mentioned here. 

  Kaisa (voiced by Kaisa Hammarlund) – A librarian who helps Hilda research her adventures. Kaisa takes a more active role in season 2 after she is revealed to be a witch.
 Trevor (voiced by Reece Pockney) – A local bully.
  Wood Man (voiced by Ako Mitchell) – A brown-coloured, tree-like being who frequently visits Hilda's former home in the forest. He habitually enters uninvited without bothering to knock on the door.

Episodes

Season 1 (2018)

Season 2 (2020)

Film (2021)

Production

Conception

Luke Pearson had previously worked in the animation industry beforehand, serving as a storyboarder on several Adventure Time episodes. Early on in the Hilda series, he never seriously considered an animated adaptation of the books, though he did have a few thoughts about how the character could work in animation even before he worked on the first comic.

Before being approached by Silvergate, there had been some interest from a few production companies about making a Hilda adaptation, though nothing had ever been agreed to. Pearson felt as if those other proposals skewed the idea of what the Hilda series is supposed to be, and that they felt off, only leaving the outer shell of the idea and changing other fundamental things.

In 2014, Silvergate producer Kurt Mueller found Hildafolk, the first book in the Hilda series, at a US indie bookstore in Brooklyn, NY. Producers at Silvergate loved the book, and were interested in bringing it to television.

Later that year, Luke Pearson received a proposal for a Hilda animated series from Silvergate through his mail. The proposal pitch was styled as a book from Hilda's satchel in Hilda and the Bird Parade, even coming with a Trollberg library card and a small elf letter inside, as well as a wooden USB stick that contained the actual pitch. At that point, three books in the Hilda series had been published, with the 4th one, Hilda and the Black Hound, being worked on at the time. Pearson enjoyed the proposal, and soon discussions began with Silvergate.

When Pearson and Silvergate started working together on a pitch, they wanted to build upon the original books while simultaneously keeping the general feel that the series had. Luke was specifically concerned in making sure the show didn't feel "too TV and formulaic."

Pitch
With help from head writer Stephanie Simpson, Luke and Silvergate created a pitch bible that would be used to pitch the show to various broadcasters. Some elements from the books were expanded upon to help fill out the show. For example, the characters of David and Frida were originally minor characters that appeared in The Black Hound. Simpson specifically picked those characters out and expanded on them so they could fill out roles as Hilda's friends. Netflix eventually picked up and greenlit the series in 2016.

Announcement
Development of the series was first briefly mentioned on June 15, 2016, in The New Yorker, stating that Netflix was planning a "twelve-episode animated series, based on the first four books, for early 2018." On June 21, 2016, Luke Pearson and Sam Arthur (co-founder of Nobrow Press) announced on Nobrow Press' official blog that Silvergate Media would also partake in the series' production, with Pearson saying:

Animation
Mercury Filmworks, a Canadian animation studio known for working on various animated Disney television shows, came on board early in development. A minute-and a half animation test was created to figure out how the show would move and look. There were various experiments with the show's design and art style to see what would work best for the adaptation. Additional animation was provided by Atomic Cartoons, who helped animate 8 episodes from the first season.

Design
When it came to designing background characters for the show, Luke would usually create preliminary sketches for a character, and it would then be translated into a finished design by Mercury. Some characters were given dot eyes as to help make characters like David better blend in to the style of the show.

The creatures in the show, as well as the book series, are heavily based on Scandinavian folklore. One of the biggest inspirations used for the show was Scandinavian Folk-Lore: Illustrations of the Traditional Beliefs of the Northern Peoples, written by William Alexander Craigie. Many creatures in the show were taken directly from these tales.

Release
The first two episodes of season one premiered at the New York International Children's Film Festival on February 25, 2018. The first and third episode of season two premiered at the NYICFF on February 22, 2020.

The first season was released as a Netflix mini-series, on September 21, 2018. The second season was released on December 14, 2020.

On November 19, 2021, Silvergate Media announced that the third season would be the final season of the series.

Reception

Critical response
Hilda has received critical acclaim from critics and fans of the Hilda books, praising its writing, characters, animation, and vocal performances. On review aggregator Rotten Tomatoes, season 1 has received a 100% fresh rating based on 10 reviews with an average rating of 9.00/10. The website's critic consensus reads, "Animated magic of the highest order, Hilda successfully captures complex feelings and charming characters into an enchanting adventure that is suited for children and adults alike". There is no critic consensus for season 2. Emily Ashby of Common Sense Media gave the series four out of five stars, stating that Hilda, herself, "is the show's best quality, but it also benefits from curious characters, exceptionally matched storytelling and Toonboom animation, and an endearing world of fantasy".

Allison Keene of Collider gave the series a four out of five stars, saying: "Regardless of age, Hilda invites viewers to join in the mystery and thrill of adventure and to find the magic in the introduction of these many creatures, and some of their curious habits, in an upbeat and wonderful world. Though Hilda must grow up and accept city life, she need not put aside her childlike wonder. Neither should we." Others focused on the character known as "The Librarian," (later named Kaisa) arguing that her character is "among the most positive pop culture depictions of librarians," apart with libraries in Cleopatra in Space and She-Ra and the Princesses of Power. The same reviewer states that the nine minutes in the first season within a library setting makes a "strong impression," including an episode featuring a special collections room, and arguing that the series makes clear the "importance of librarians and libraries for years to come."

Awards and nominations
At the 2021 Daytime Creative Emmy Awards, Hilda won for "Outstanding Children's Series" and "Outstanding Editing for a Daytime Animated Program". It was also nominated for "Outstanding Voice Directing for a Daytime Animated Program", losing to the Hulu animated series Animaniacs, which also tied with Hilda for the award for "Outstanding Editing for a Daytime Animated Program".

Tie-in material

Feature film
 
An 82-minute movie based on Hilda and the Mountain King entered production in 2019, and was released on December 30, 2021.

Mobile game
A mobile game based on the series titled Hilda Creatures was released on the App Store on October 18, 2018. The game was developed by British developer BIGUMAKU. An Android version was released on December 6, 2018. Both the iOS and Android versions were removed from their respective stores in March 2022.

Novelizations
Hilda and the Hidden People, a novel based on the first two episodes of the series, was released on September 4, 2018. The book was authored by Stephen Davies and illustrated by Seaerra Miller. Two more books based on the first season were released, titled Hilda and the Great Parade and Hilda and the Nowhere Space. They were respectively released on January 22 and May 21, 2019. Both were also penned by Davies and Miller.

Three more novels based on the series, specifically the second season, titled Hilda and the Time Worm, Hilda and the Ghost Ship, and Hilda and the White Woff were all released on November 17, 2020. The books were once again written by Davies, and all three were illustrated by Victoria Evans.

Notes

References

External links
 
 

Hilda
2010s Canadian animated television series
2010s Canadian children's television series
2020s Canadian animated television series
2020s Canadian children's television series
2018 Canadian television series debuts
2010s British animated television series
2010s British children's television series
2020s British animated television series
2020s British children's television series
2018 British television series debuts
Animated television series about children
Annie Award winners
British children's animated adventure television series
British children's animated comedy television series
British children's animated fantasy television series
Canadian children's animated adventure television series
Canadian children's animated comedy television series
Canadian children's animated fantasy television series
English-language Netflix original programming
Netflix children's programming
Animated television series by Netflix
Sony Pictures franchises
Television shows based on comics
Television series by Sony Pictures Television
Magic realism television series
Urban fantasy
Daytime Emmy Award for Outstanding Animated Program winners
de:Hilda (Comic)#Fernsehserie